The Point Defiance–Tahlequah ferry is a ferry route across Puget Sound between the Point Defiance ferry terminal in Tacoma and Tahlequah, Washington, on the southern tip of Vashon Island.  Since 1951 the only ferries employed on the route have belonged to the Washington state ferry system, currently the largest ferry system in the United States.  Point Defiance-Tahlequah is the shortest route in the system.

Description
This ferry route is 1.7 miles long, with terminals at Point Defiance Park in Tacoma and on Vashon Island, at Tahlequah.

Vessels
Until 1967, the wooden ferry Skansonia (capacity: 308 passengers, 32 autos) was regularly assigned to the route.  In 1967, Skansonia, built in 1929, was replaced with Hiyu (capacity: 200 passengers, 40 autos), which had been built specifically for the route. However, traffic soon outpaced the Hiyu, which was replaced by the Olympic and later the 48-car ferry . Since 2012,  has served the route.

See also
 Washington State Ferries
 Ferries in Washington State

Notes

References
 Demoro, Harre, The Evergreen Fleet: A Pictorial History of Washington State Ferries, Golden West Books, San Marino CA (1971) 
 Kline, Mary S., and Bayless, G.A., Ferryboats: A Legend on Puget Sound, Bayless Books, Seattle, WA (1983) 
 Newell, Gordon R. ed., H.W. McCurdy Marine History of the Pacific Northwest, Superior Publishing, Seattle WA 1966

External links 
 

Ferry routes in western Washington (state)
History of King County, Washington
History of Pierce County, Washington
Transportation in King County, Washington
Transportation in Pierce County, Washington
Vashon, Washington